Aadan Carab was a poet born in Darawiish-controlled territory in 1917. The early forms of poetry of Aadan Carab is primarily concerned with clan duels, and or clans prevailing over others either in jest or pertaining to actual events. His latter poetry is about pastoral life and human nature. According to Aadan Carab, the Dhulbahante clan suffered a genocide at the hands of European colonialists, particularly the British who he claimed wholesale slaughtered the Dhulbahante due to them being Darawiish.

Career

Individual incidents
An example of his poetry about clan duels includes the Dhul u Dheer poem wherein he describes a battle that occurred in the late 1950s, which began as a battle between the Majeerteen subclan Biciidyahan and the Dhulbahante subclan Ali Geri over. Soon after, the Dhulbahante were reinforced by other Reer Khair clan members as well as Ararsame, whilst the Biciidyahan were reinforced by other Umar Mahamuud Majeerteen clan members. Eventually, the Dhulbahante militarily prevailed and the following poem was written, of which the following is a snippet:

Individuality
However, historians have noted the non-tribalist nature of Aadan Carab's poems:

Dhulbahante destroyed
In his poem , Aadan Carab, a Somali poet mentions on the incident stating "" Writer Idaaja interprets this message as stating that the aerial bombardment campaign was emblematic of a Dhulbahante  (meaning broken / destroyed) orchestrated by the European colonialists:

Bibliography
2002: Aadan-carab: 1917-2001 : maanmsoyahannadii hore kii u dambeeyey, by Axmed Faarax Cali

References 

Somalian poets
1917 births
2001 deaths